Phineas Mendel Heilprin (November 1801 in Lublin, Poland – 30 January 1863 in Washington, D.C., United States) was a Jewish scholar.

He early settled in Piotrków and subsequently in Tomaszów, where he became a manufacturer and merchant, but, in consequence of oppression by the Russian government, he removed in 1842 to Hungary. His sympathy was with the people in 1848, and after the failure of the revolutionary movement he determined to leave the country. In 1859 he came to the United States, where he remained until his death. He was a close student of the Talmud, and also of the Greek and later German philosophers, acquiring a high reputation among Jewish scholars as a conservative reformer. His works, written in Hebrew, include several controversial writings, dealing with the reform movement among the Jews.

Family
His son Michael was actively involved in the revolutions of 1848 in Hungary and also emigrated to the United States.

His son Angelo was a geologist, paleontologist, naturalist, and explorer in the US.

See also
 Heilprin

References

1801 births
1863 deaths
People from Lublin
Polish emigrants to the United States
American people of Polish-Jewish descent
Talmudists
Forty-Eighters